Allotinus macassarensis is a butterfly in the family Lycaenidae. It was described by William Jacob Holland in 1891. It is found in Asia.

Subspecies
Allotinus macassarensis macassarensis (southern Sulawesi, Banggai Island)
Allotinus macassarensis menadensis Eliot, 1967 (northern Sulawesi, Bangka Island)

References

Butterflies described in 1891
Allotinus
Butterflies of Asia